Meyliidae is a family of nematodes belonging to the order Desmoscolecida.

Genera:
 Boucherius Decraemer & Jensen, 1981
 Erebus Bussau
 Erebussau Bezerra, Pape, Hauquier & Vanreusel, 2021
 Gerlachius Andrássy, 1976
 Meylia Gerlach, 1956
 Noffsingeria Decraemer & Jensen, 1981

References

Nematodes